The Western Australian Premier's Book Awards is an annual book award provided by the Government of Western Australia, and managed by the State Library of Western Australia.

History and format
Annual literary awards were inaugurated by the Western Australian Government in 1982 to honour and celebrate the literary achievements of Western Australian writers. Until 1990 the Western Australian Premier's Book Awards were called the WA Week Literary Awards. The title of the award refers to the year of publication, rather than the year in which the awards were announced e.g.the 2011 awards for works published that year were announced in 2012

The categories included poetry, non-fiction, fiction, Western Australian history, children's book, YA fiction, scripts and digital narrative. There was also a Premier's Prize, which was awarded to an overall winner.

The Barnett government downgraded the awards from an annual event to a biennial one much to the disappointment of the WA arts sector.

The McGowan government reinstated the annual award format in 2018. Currently there are four categories – the Western Australian Writer's Fellowship (valued at $60,000), the Premier's Prize for Writing for Children ($15,000), the Premier's Prize for an Emerging Writer ($15,000) and the Daisy Utemorrah Award for Indigenous Authors ($15,000 and publishing contract with Magabala Books).

There have been calls for the awards to be restored to their previous levels as there are currently no categories for established poets, nor fiction and non-fiction writers.

Honorees

1990s

2000s

2010s

2020s

References

External links
 



Australian literary awards
Australian non-fiction book awards
Western Australian literature
Australian history awards